Al Qala is a village in northern Bahrain that is most famous for being the location of the Bahrain Fort, the country's first UNESCO World Heritage Site. The village is also the site of expansion, with multiple housing projects being constructed in its vicinity, some of which was delayed because of the archaeological sites in the village. The village lies under the Northern Governorate administrative region.

References

See also
Alcalá (disambiguation)

Populated places in the Northern Governorate, Bahrain